The 1964 Cleveland Indians season was a season in American baseball. The team finished in a tie for sixth place in the American League with the Minnesota Twins, while winning 79 and losing 83, 20 games behind the AL champion New York Yankees.

Offseason 
 Prior to 1964 season: Dave Nelson was signed as an amateur free agent by the Indians.

Regular season 
In 1964, Vernon Stouffer became an investor in the Cleveland Indians due to the threat of the franchise relocating.

Manager Birdie Tebbetts suffered a heart attack during the offseason. George Strickland served as the Indians' acting manager during his convalescence. Tebbetts returned to the team on July 3.

Season standings

Record vs. opponents

Notable transactions 
 September 5, 1964: Pedro Ramos was traded by the Indians to the New York Yankees for players to be named later and $75,000. The Yankees completed the deal by sending Ralph Terry to the Indians on October 21 and Bud Daley to the Indians on November 27.

Opening Day Lineup

Roster

Player stats

Batting

Starters by position 
Note: Pos = Position; G = Games played; AB = At bats; H = Hits; Avg. = Batting average; HR = Home runs; RBI = Runs batted in

Other batters 
Note: G = Games played; AB = At bats; H = Hits; Avg. = Batting average; HR = Home runs; RBI = Runs batted in

Pitching

Starting pitchers 
Note: G = Games pitched; IP = Innings pitched; W = Wins; L = Losses; ERA = Earned run average; SO = Strikeouts

Other pitchers 
Note: G = Games pitched; IP = Innings pitched; W = Wins; L = Losses; ERA = Earned run average; SO = Strikeouts

Relief pitchers 
Note: G = Games pitched; W = Wins; L = Losses; SV = Saves; ERA = Earned run average; SO = Strikeouts

Farm system

Awards 
 Vic Davalillo, Gold Glove Award

References

External links 
1964 Cleveland Indians season at Baseball Reference

Cleveland Indians seasons
Cleveland Indians season
Cleveland